Psydrax paradoxa is a species of plant in the family Rubiaceae. It is endemic to New Caledonia.

References

paradoxa
Endemic flora of New Caledonia
Vulnerable plants
Taxonomy articles created by Polbot